Rhyncogonus is a genus of beetle in family Curculionidae. The genus is endemic to islands in the Pacific Ocean.

Species 
There are currently 66 described species in the genus Rhyncogonus (incomplete list):

Rhyncogonus albipilis Van Dyke, 1937
Rhyncogonus angustus Van Dyke, 1937
Rhyncogonus biformis  Perkins, 1926
Rhyncogonus blackburni Sharp, 1885
†Rhyncogonus bryani 
Rhyncogonus caudatus Van Dyke, 1937
Rhyncogonus cordiformis Van Dyke, 1937
Rhyncogonus corvinus Van Dyke, 1937
Rhyncogonus debilis Van Dyke, 1937
Rhyncogonus depressus Perkins, 1900
Rhyncogonus dubius Perkins, 1900
Rhyncogonus duhameli 
Rhyncogonus erebus Van Dyke, 1937
Rhyncogonus excavatus Van Dyke, 1937
Rhyncogonus expansus Van Dyke, 1937
Rhyncogonus exsul Perkins, 1926
Rhyncogonus extraneus Perkins, 1910
Rhyncogonus fosbergi Van Dyke, 1937
Rhyncogonus freycinetiae Perkins, 1910
Rhyncogonus funereus Perkins, 1900
Rhyncogonus fuscus Perkins, 1900
Rhyncogonus fulvus Van Dyke, 1937
Rhyncogonus giffardi Sharp, 1919
Rhyncogonus glabrus Van Dyke, 1937
Rhyncogonus gracilis Van Dyke, 1937
Rhyncogonus hendersoni Van Dyke, 1937
Rhyncogonus hispidus Van Dyke, 1937
Rhyncogonus interstitialis Van Dyke, 1937
Rhyncogonus lineatus Van Dyke, 1937
Rhyncogonus longulus Van Dyke 1937
Rhyncogonus nigerrimus Van Dyke 1937
Rhyncogonus nigroaeneus Van Dyke 1937
Rhyncogonus nodosus Van Dyke, 1937
Rhyncogonus obscurus Van Dyke, 1937
Rhyncogonus opacipennis Van Dyke, 1937
Rhyncogonus othello Van Dyke, 1937
Rhyncogonus pectoralis Van Dyke, 1937
Rhyncogonus pleuralis Van Dyke, 19377
Rhyncogonus pubipennis Van Dyke, 1937
Rhyncogonus pulvereus Van Dyke, 1937
Rhyncogonus regularis Van Dyke, 1937
Rhyncogonus rufulus Van Dyke, 1937
Rhyncogonus sparsus Van Dyke, 1937
Rhyncogonus submetallicus Van Dyke, 1935
Rhyncogonus tenebrosus Van Dyke, 1937
Rhyncogonus testudineus Van Dyke, 1937
Rhyncogonus tuberosus Van Dyke, 1937
Rhyncogonus vagus Van Dyke, 1937
Rhyncogonus variabilis Van Dyke, 1937
Rhyncogonus ventralis Van Dyke, 1937
Rhyncogonus viridescens Van Dyke, 1937
Rhyncogonus zimmermani Van Dyke, 1937

References

Entiminae
Taxonomy articles created by Polbot